= Pharnacia (Phrygia) =

Town in ancient Phrygia

Pharnacia or Pharnaceia or Pharnakeia (Ancient Greek: Φαρνάκεια) was a town of ancient Phrygia (in modern-day Turkey).

Its site is unlocated.
